Adventures of the Mind is an achievement-focused mentoring camp for talented high school students. Educators from across the nation nominate students whom they believe, with guidance and nurture, can maximize their potential and make important contributions to society. Honored guests share their life stories that can serve as a road map to the students on their own personal paths to success.

History
Founded in 2003, the Adventures of the Mind achievement mentoring camp brings together, on a college campus, high potential teens from across the country with accomplished mentors from a variety of fields: artists, astronauts, athletes, entrepreneurs, inventors, journalists, Nobel laureates, novelists, poets, poker players, programmers, public servants, Pulitzer prize winners, scholars, and more. Adventures of the Mind provides the students — who are the great thinker and achievers of tomorrow — with an opportunity to interact with some of the great thinkers and achievers of today. The camp runs for 7 days and is developed by student achievement and advocacy services. Murray Gell-Mann who was awarded the 1969 Nobel Prize in Physics and a Mentor at the 2011 summit, is quoted as saying:

Past camps

Student selection process
Student attendees are selected through a highly personalized and rigorous search that goes beyond traditional measures of achievement — grades and test scores — by asking teachers to personally nominate an exceptional teen. Attendees are chosen regardless of learning disabilities, socioeconomic factors, or other obstacles that may obscure real potential. Additionally, participants are chosen from runners-up in national competitions ranging from the Presidential Scholars Program to the Intel Science Talent Search to the National Poetry Slam. Adventures of the Mind targets high potential students who may not yet garner the same level of recognition as their peers, but would benefit just as much from the experience the camp provides.

Mentors
Mentors represent a wide variety of backgrounds and fields including arts, business, literature, public service, philanthropy, science and more.

Sergey Brin
Ingrid Daubechies
Rita Dove
Annie Duke
Bonnie Dunbar
Murray Gell-Mann
John R. Horner
Nathan Myhrvold
Lisa Randall
Amy Tan
Luis von Ahn
Herschel Walker

External links
 Official Website

References

 

Youth empowerment organizations
Summer camps in the United States
Educational organizations
Youth organizations based in the United States